Mohamed Siluvangi (born 2 March 1967 in Kinshasa) is a light heavyweight Congolese boxer who turned pro in 1993. He competed in the men's middleweight event at the 1992 Summer Olympics.

Professional boxing record

References

Living people
1967 births
Democratic Republic of the Congo male boxers
Light-heavyweight boxers
Olympic boxers of the Democratic Republic of the Congo
Boxers at the 1992 Summer Olympics
Sportspeople from Kinshasa